During the 2005–06 season, the Tercera División—the fourth tier of professional football in Spain—consisted of eighteen regional groups.

Classification

Group I

Group II

Group III

Group IV

Group V

Group VI

Group VII

Group VIII

Group IX

Group X

Group XI

Group XII

Group XIII

Group XIV

Group XV Navarra

Group XV La Rioja

Group XVI

Group XVII

External links
Futbolme.com

 
Tercera División seasons
4
Spain